The Glass Cage is a 1965 internationally co-produced drama film directed by Philippe Arthuys and Jean-Louis Levi-Alvarès. The film was selected as the Israeli entry for the Best Foreign Language Film at the 38th Academy Awards, but was not accepted as a nominee. It was also entered into the 4th Moscow International Film Festival.

Cast
 Georges Rivière as Claude
 Jean Négroni as Pierre
 Françoise Prévost
 Maurice Poli as Antoine
 Dina Doron as Sonia
 Azaria Rapaport as Journalist
 Rina Ganor as Tamar
 Natan Cogan as Doctor

See also
 List of submissions to the 38th Academy Awards for Best Foreign Language Film
 List of Israeli submissions for the Academy Award for Best Foreign Language Film

References

External links
 

1965 films
French drama films
1960s French-language films
1960s Hebrew-language films
1965 drama films
French black-and-white films
Israeli black-and-white films
Films directed by Philippe Arthuys
Holocaust films
1960s multilingual films
French multilingual films
Israeli multilingual films
1960s French films